The 2023 NASCAR Cup Series is the 75th season for NASCAR professional stock car racing in the United States and the 52nd season for the modern-era Cup Series. The season started with the Busch Light Clash at the Los Angeles Memorial Coliseum on February 5. That race was followed by the Daytona Duel qualifying races and the 65th running of the Daytona 500 (the first points race of the season) on February 19, both at Daytona International Speedway. The season will end with the NASCAR Cup Series Championship Race at Phoenix Raceway on November 5.

This will be the final season for 2014 champion and Stewart-Haas Racing driver Kevin Harvick, who announced his plans to retire at the end of the season on January 12, 2023.

2023 is also the first season since the inception of the NASCAR Cup Series charter system in 2016 that there were no charters that were sold or leased by teams for the season. All 36 charters are with the same cars that had them in 2022 (although one car was renumbered).

Teams and drivers

Chartered teams

Non-chartered teams

Limited schedule

Notes

Changes

Teams
 On August 3, 2022, 3F Racing, which will be the first team from Germany to compete in the NASCAR Cup Series, announced plans to run part-time in 2022 starting at the Charlotte Roval. However, team owner Dennis Hirtz announced that the team's debut would be delayed to 2023, where they plan to attempt 10 races before running full-time in 2024. The team's driver(s), sponsors and crew chief have all yet to be announced.
 On August 25, 2022, Front Row Motorsports announced that Zane Smith will drive a part-time third car for the team in select races including the Daytona 500.
 Bubba Wallace will move back to the No. 23 car in 2023 after driving the No. 45 car during the 2022 playoffs to compete for the owners' championship after Kurt Busch's concussion sidelined him for the rest of the 2022 season.
 On November 4, 2022, seven-time NASCAR champion Jimmie Johnson purchased an ownership stake in Petty GMS, which later rebranded to Legacy Motor Club. He will run select races in 2023, including an attempt to make the 2023 Daytona 500.
 On December 12, 2022, Brett Griffin, who was the spotter for Justin Haley's No. 31 car full-time in 2022, announced on his podcast, Door, Bumper, Clear, that he would not spot full-time in 2023 but would remain with Kaulig Racing to spot for them in select races in 2023 including the Daytona 500, essentially revealing that the team would field a third part-time car in that race. Kaulig has yet to officially announce that they will be fielding a part-time third car in the Cup Series in 2023. On January 10, 2023, Kaulig tweeted an image of the No. 13 in their number font, signaling that the number of their part-time third Cup Series car would be the No. 13. MBM Motorsports uses the No. 13 in the Xfinity Series, the only other series Kaulig fields entries in, and the No. 13 is not being used in the Cup Series. On January 18, 2023, Kaulig announced that Chandler Smith will attempt to make his Cup Series debut in the 2023 Daytona 500, driving the No. 13 car. He will also run four additional races, which includes the NASCAR All-Star Race.
 On January 13, 2023, 23XI revealed in a tweet that they would be fielding a third car at the Daytona 500. Later that day, Jordan Bianchi of The Athletic reported that Travis Pastrana would be the driver of that car. On January 17, 2023, it was announced that Pastrana would drive the No. 67 car with sponsorship from Black Rifle Coffee Company. Eric Phillips will be the crew chief.
 On February 11, 2023, Bob Pockrass from Fox Sports reported that Finish Line Motorsports Marketing, a marketing agency in business since 1997, would start a race team that would enter the No. 80 Ford driven by J. J. Yeley in the 2023 Daytona 500. However, later that day, TobyChristie.com reported that FLMM would not be entering the Daytona 500 and would instead debut in the race at Phoenix in March. Additionally, the team has an alliance with Reaume Brothers Racing (similar to the one Team Hezeberg had in 2022), who also confirmed in a tweet that FLMM would be postponing their debut. FLMM did not end up attempting the race at Phoenix in March and the No. 80 car was not on the entry list. On March 10, Frontstretch reporter Jared Haas tweeted that he spoke to the team's owner (Fred Zimmerman) who stated that they have postponed their debut to the race at Talladega in April. Additionally, Zimmerman stated that the team has two Next Gen cars in its fleet and six full-time employees on their staff.
 On February 18, 2023, it was reported that MBM Motorsports will not participate in the 2023 season, although team owner Carl Long stated that they do have cars prepared pending sponsorship. The team's last Cup appearance was in 2022, when the No. 55 driven by J. J. Yeley finished 25th at Talladega.

Drivers
 On July 15, 2022, Petty GMS Motorsports announced that Ty Dillon would not return to the No. 42 in 2023. On August 10, 2022, Noah Gragson was announced to replace Dillon.
 After suffering a concussion in qualifying for the 2022 race at Pocono, Kurt Busch announced on October 15, 2022 that he would not run full-time in 2023. Tyler Reddick, who was set to join the team in 2024, will move over from Richard Childress Racing a year earlier and replace Busch in the No. 45. After his move to 23XI for 2024 was announced, Reddick was going to return to RCR for one more year but was bought out of his last year of his contract in order to replace Busch in the No. 45 in 2023. (Busch has a multi-year deal with 23XI and will stay with the team in an advisory role and could drive part-time for the team once he gets cleared to race again.)
 On August 26, 2022, although Aric Almirola announced he would retire from driving full-time after the 2022 season, he announced that he has signed a multi-year deal with Stewart-Haas Racing, delaying his retirement.
 After months of rumors and speculation over his 2023 plans and contract negotiations with Joe Gibbs Racing, Kyle Busch announced that he would leave JGR and join Richard Childress Racing beginning in 2023 in a multi-year deal. Busch will replace Tyler Reddick, who was originally announced to drive a third RCR car in 2023 before leaving for 23XI Racing in 2024, but after Kurt Busch's decision to not run full-time after his concussion, Reddick's contract was bought out by 23XI Racing, allowing him to go to 23XI a year early.
 On November 15, 2022, it was announced that Ty Gibbs would replace Busch and the car would be renumbered to the No. 54, the number Gibbs used in the Xfinity Series. Gibbs' Xfinity Series crew chief, Chris Gayle, will also move up to the Cup Series, replacing Ben Beshore.
 On October 3, 2022, Beard Motorsports owner Linda Beard told Dustin Albino from Jayski that the team will enter the 2023 Daytona 500. Noah Gragson will not return to this car in 2023 as he will drive the Petty GMS No. 42 car full-time. On October 28, 2022, the team announced that Austin Hill, who drives full-time for Richard Childress Racing in the Xfinity Series, would drive the car in six races (both Daytona and both Talladega races, the Chicago Street Course and Michigan) in 2023.
 On October 3, 2022, Jordan Bianchi from The Athletic reported that A. J. Allmendinger, who has driven this car part-time as well as Kaulig's No. 16 Xfinity Series car full-time, would drive the No. 16 Cup Series car full-time in 2023. It would be his first full season in the Cup Series since 2018. On October 5, 2022, Allmendinger was officially announced as the full-time driver of the No. 16. Matt Swiderski will return as crew chief.
 On November 16, 2022, Stewart-Haas Racing announced that Ryan Preece will replace Cole Custer in the No. 41 in 2023 while Custer will move back to the Xfinity Series. 
 On December 12, 2022, Josh Bilicki was announced to drive the No. 78 on a part-time schedule.
 On January 31, 2023, Rick Ware Racing announced that Riley Herbst had signed to drive the No. 15 at the 2023 Daytona 500.
 On February 7, 2023, Front Row Motorsports announced that Zane Smith will attempt to make the 2023 Daytona 500 in the No. 36. In addition, Smith will drive the No. 38 at Phoenix, Talladega, Charlotte, Sonoma, Texas, and the Charlotte Roval, sharing the ride with Todd Gilliland.
 On March 3, 2023, Chase Elliott suffered a leg injury while snowboarding in Colorado. JR Motorsports Xfinity Series driver Josh Berry would substitute for him in the Hendrick Motorsports No. 9 car in the race at Las Vegas two days later. On March 7, 2023, Hendrick announced that Berry would continue to fill in for Elliott in the No. 9 for five of the next six races. The only one of those six where he will not be in the car is the race at COTA, where IMSA driver Jordan Taylor will make his NASCAR debut filling in for Elliott. Taylor was teammates with Hendrick Motorsports Vice Chairman Jeff Gordon in the 2017 24 Hours of Daytona which they won.
 On March 8, 2023, Trackhouse Racing Team announced that 2007 Formula One World Champion Kimi Räikkönen would return to the No. 91 at COTA. Räikkönen previously drove the No. 91 at Watkins Glen in 2022. He also scored his final F1 victory at COTA in 2018.
 On March 9, 2023, Kaulig Racing announced that dirt track racing driver Jonathan Davenport would drive their No. 13 car in the Bristol dirt race. He will attempt to make his Cup Series debut and first NASCAR start since failing to qualify for the Truck Series spring race at Martinsville in 2013.
 On March 9, 2023, it was announced that 2009 Formula One World Champion Jenson Button would drive the Rick Ware Racing No. 15 at Circuit of the Americas, the Chicago Street Course, and the Indianapolis Motor Speedway road course. His entry will also be fielded in collaboration with Stewart-Haas Racing.

Crew chiefs
 On August 26, 2022, Greg Ives, crew chief of the Hendrick Motorsports No. 48 driven by Alex Bowman, announced that he would be stepping down from the role to spend more time with his family. On October 14, 2022, Blake Harris, who was the crew chief of the Front Row Motorsports No. 34 car in 2022, was announced to replace Ives as Bowman's crew chief.
 On September 2, 2022, Justin Alexander, crew chief of the Richard Childress Racing No. 3 driven by Austin Dillon, announced that he would be stepping down from the role. On October 28, 2022, RCR announced that Keith Rodden, who crew chiefed in the Cup Series from 2014 to 2017 for Jamie McMurray at Chip Ganassi Racing and then for Kasey Kahne at Hendrick Motorsports, would be Dillon's new crew chief in 2023.
 On October 25, 2022, Noah Gragson's Xfinity Series crew chief Luke Lambert was announced to move from JR Motorsports to Petty GMS (later renamed Legacy Motor Club) on their No. 42 car.
 On November 9, 2022, it was announced that Brian Pattie would leave for Kyle Busch Motorsports to crew chief their No. 51 truck in the NASCAR Craftsman Truck Series. Mike Kelley was announced as the new crew chief of the No. 47.
 On November 16, 2022, Stewart-Haas Racing announced that Chad Johnston would replace Mike Shiplett as the crew chief of their No. 41 car. Johnston was previously the crew chief of the No. 17 truck for David Gilliland Racing (now TRICON Garage) in the Truck Series where he worked with multiple drivers including Preece. Johnston is returning to SHR having previously worked for the team as the crew chief of their No. 14 car in 2014 and 2015 when it was driven by team co-owner Tony Stewart.
 On November 23, 2022, Front Row Motorsports announced that Travis Peterson, who was the engineer and interim crew chief for the No. 17 RFK car in 2022, will be the new crew chief of the No. 34 car, replacing Blake Harris, who left for Hendrick Motorsports to be the new crew chief of the No. 48 car. Ryan Bergenty, who was the car chief for McDowell, will be the new crew chief for the No. 38 car replacing Seth Barbour, who was the crew chief for that car in 2022, who has been promoted to technical director for FRM.
 On January 12, 2023, Live Fast Motorsports announced that David (George) Ingram Jr. would be the new crew chief of their No. 78 car in 2023. Ingram moves to LFM from team co-owner B. J. McLeod's Xfinity Series team, B. J. McLeod Motorsports, where he was previously a crew chief for them in that series. Lee Leslie, who was the crew chief of the No. 78 car in 2022, switched teams and series with Ingram and became a crew chief for BJMM in the Xfinity Series in 2023.
 On January 23, 2023, Legacy Motor Club announced that Todd Gordon would crew chief the No. 84 car for Jimmie Johnson.
 On January 26, 2023, it was revealed through the release of the Clash entry list that Jerry Kelley would be the new crew chief of Rick Ware Racing's No. 51 car, replacing Billy Plourde, who moved to the team's No. 15 car in 2023, replacing Kevyn Rebolledo.

Interim crew chiefs
 On March 15, 2023, NASCAR suspended all four Hendrick Motorsports crew chiefs (Cliff Daniels, Alan Gustafson, Rudy Fugle and Blake Harris) as well as Kaulig Racing No. 31 car crew chief Trent Owens for four races (Atlanta, COTA, Richmond, and the Bristol dirt race) after it was discovered during practice for the race at Phoenix in March that the hood louvers on all five cars were illegally modified. As a result, each team received an L2 penalty. On March 16, Kaulig announced that they would appeal the penalty and Owens' suspension was deferred until after the appeal date. On March 15, Hendrick announced that they would appeal the penalty but would choose to not delay their crew chiefs' suspensions until after the appeal date. The next day, the team announced their interim crew chiefs:
 Kevin Meendering will crew chief the No. 5. He returns to the same role he had in four races in 2022 when Cliff Daniels was suspended. He was also Jimmie Johnson's permanent crew chief for part of the 2019 season.
 Tom Gray will crew chief the No. 9. He is the car's engineer and was also the interim crew chief for it at Watkins Glen in 2021 when Alan Gustafson was suspended.
 Brian Campe will crew chief the No. 24. He works as a technical director for Hendrick and was also the crew chief for the JR Motorsports No. 5 car in what is now the Xfinity Series in 2009.
 Greg Ives will crew chief the No. 48. He was the previously the permanent crew chief of the car until the end of the 2022 season, stepping down from the job for a non-crew chiefing job at Hendrick that would allow him to spend more time with his family.

Manufacturers
 On November 28, 2022, Rick Ware Racing announced that they would have a technical alliance with RFK Racing beginning in 2023, ending their alliance with Stewart-Haas Racing that they had for one year in 2022.
 On December 1, 2022, Live Fast Motorsports announced that they would switch from Ford to Chevrolet and have ECR Engines in 2023.

Sponsorship
 On December 20, 2021, Joe Gibbs Racing No. 18 car primary sponsor M&M's and parent company Mars, Incorporated announced they would be leaving NASCAR and not return in 2023. JGR was unable to find a replacement sponsor. (A deal with Oracle Corporation fell through.) As a result, driver Kyle Busch left JGR for Richard Childress Racing and was replaced by Ty Gibbs who brought sponsorship from Monster Energy, which sponsored him in the Xfinity and ARCA Series. They will sponsor him in the Cup Series in a "strong capacity".
 On January 4, 2023, it was revealed that Adrenaline Shoc (A SHOC Energy), which had been a sponsor of the Hendrick Motorsports No. 9 for two races in each of the last two years, will not return as a sponsor in 2023. On February 16, 2023, driver Chase Elliott was announced as the latest member of the Coca-Cola Racing Family. Coca-Cola has had a rich history with the Elliott family, with Bill Elliott being a founding member of the Coca-Cola Racing Family in 1998. This also marks the iconic soft drink brand's return to Hendrick Motorsports since it last sponsored Jeff Gordon in 1996.
 On January 16, 2023, Richard Childress Racing announced that Netspend, a financial solutions company, will sponsor the No. 8 for the COTA race and select races in 2023.
 On January 31, 2023, SunnyD was announced as the sponsor of the Rick Ware Racing No. 15 driven by Riley Herbst at the 2023 Daytona 500. In addition, the orange juice brand will sponsor the Stewart-Haas Racing No. 4 driven by Kevin Harvick at Darlington and the Kansas playoff race.
 On February 3, 2023, Joe Gibbs Racing announced that Monster Energy will sponsor the No. 54 driven by Ty Gibbs for majority of the 2023 season. Monster Energy has supported Gibbs since 2019, including his 2021 ARCA Menards Series and 2022 NASCAR Xfinity Series championships.
 On February 15, 2023, hard rock band Guns N' Roses announced it will sponsor the Legacy Motor Club No. 43 driven by Erik Jones for the 2023 Daytona 500.

Potential and rumored changes

Teams
 On October 9, 2021, when it was announced that Team Hezeberg would debut in the Cup Series part-time with the No. 27 car in 2022, the team stated that they hoped to field the car full-time in 2023. As of February 2023, the team has yet to reaffirm this plan.
 On June 20, 2022, Cody Efaw, the General Manager of Niece Motorsports, stated that the team could expand into the Cup Series in 2023. They would likely field a part-time car. Efaw stated that he would like to have Carson Hocevar, one of the team's full-time Truck Series drivers, drive for the team in the Cup Series.
 On June 25, 2022, Dale Earnhardt Jr. stated on an episode of The Dale Jr. Download that his Xfinity Series team, JR Motorsports, may expand into the Cup Series. On June 28, 2022, JRM co-owner Kelley Earnhardt Miller stated on SiriusXM NASCAR Radio that if JRM debuts in the Cup Series, the team would more than likely only field a part-time car in 2023 before running full-time sometime in the future.
 On October 11, 2022, NFL Hall of Famer Tim Brown revealed on the podcast The Bag with Rashad Jennings and Lindsay McCormick that he has been looking into entering NASCAR as a team owner. He was set to start a team in the 2000s which would have had an alliance with what was then known as Roush Fenway Racing but the deal fell though after the Great Recession.
 On November 30, 2022, Adam Stern of Sports Business Journal reported that Phyllis Newhouse, the founder of cybersecurity firm Xtreme Solutions, has been looking into entering NASCAR as a team owner. She would become the first African American woman to own a NASCAR team.

Drivers
 On June 16, 2022, Brodie Kostecki, who competes in the Repco Supercars Championship in Australia and previously drove in what is now the ARCA Menards Series East in 2013 and 2014, expressed interest in returning to NASCAR and making his Cup Series debut in 2023. Kostecki could be a candidate for the Trackhouse No. 91 car as he meets the criteria for the team's Project91 program: being an international driver (Australia) from another racing series (Supercars).
 On June 18, 2022, after winning the Superstar Racing Experience (SRX) race at Five Flags Speedway, Hélio Castroneves stated that Don Hawk, the CEO of the SRX, would try to find him a ride in the Daytona 500 if he won an SRX race. It would be the four-time Indianapolis 500 winner's debut in NASCAR. At that time, the Trackhouse No. 91 car had been seen as the most likely car that Castroneves could drive in the race as he met the criteria for the team's Project91 program: being an international driver (Brazil) from another racing series (IndyCar). On September 26, 2022,  Supercars Championship driver Shane van Gisbergen revealed he was in talks with Trackhouse to make a Cup Series cameo in 2023. On November 22, 2022, Adam Stern from Sports Business Journal tweeted that Castroneves was a candidate to drive the Trackhouse No. 91 car and The Money Team Racing No. 50 car in the Daytona 500, and Money Team co-owner Willy Auchmoody confirmed in an interview with TobyChristie.com on December 5 that the team had talked to Castroneves about potentially driving for them in the Daytona 500. On January 26, 2023, Castroneves stated that he would not attempt to qualify for the Daytona 500 in 2023.
 On July 27, 2022, Daniil Kvyat stated that he would like to focus on competing in NASCAR after having made his debut with Team Hezeberg at the 2022 Verizon 200 at the Brickyard instead of returning to Formula One or other racing series in Europe. (Kvyat is from Russia and came to the United States after the 2022 Russian invasion of Ukraine.) He has yet to announce specific plans although he has hinted that he wants to run full-time in the Cup Series or another NASCAR series.
 On December 5, 2022, The Money Team co-owner Willy Auchmoody revealed to TobyChristie.com that the No. 50 car will run at least six races in 2023 with Conor Daly, who drove for the team at the Charlotte Roval in 2022, returning to drive for the team in at least some of those races. TMT has talked to Hélio Castroneves about potentially driving for the team in the Daytona 500 although a deal has not been finalized. On January 26, 2023, Adam Stern from Sports Business Journal reported that Daly could drive the car in the Daytona 500 after Hélio Castroneves, who was seen as the frontrunner for that car in the race, decided not to enter the race.
 On January 26, 2023, Casey Mears stated that he would like to return to the Cup Series to reach 500 total starts in the series. He currently has 489 starts and would need to run 11 more races to reach 500. Mears, who ran full-time in the Cup Series from 2003 to 2009 and 2011 to 2016, last ran a NASCAR and Cup Series race in 2019. The Legacy Motor Club No. 84 car is considered a possible ride for Mears if the team, which is co-owned by his former 2007 and 2008 Hendrick Motorsports teammate Jimmie Johnson, decides to enter it in more races on top of Johnson's races in the part-time car.

Rule changes
 NASCAR will debut a "wet weather" package for short tracks in 2023 in response to rain delays. The package will consist of a windshield wiper, flaps behind the wheels, taillights, and rain tires. This was made official on January 31, 2023, when NASCAR announced that the Los Angeles Memorial Coliseum, Martinsville Speedway, New Hampshire Motor Speedway, North Wilksboro Speedway, Richmond Raceway, and Phoenix Raceway would have wet weather packages.
 Due to safety concerns from the 2022 season with drivers suffering concussions and feeling sore due to rear-end crashes, NASCAR made changes to the Next Gen’s rear structure for 2023 to create a bigger crumple zone in the hopes that it will prevent the energy from those impacts from affecting the driver. The adjustment also includes slight changes to the center section of the car.
 NASCAR formally banned drivers from wall-riding (after Ross Chastain's "Hail Melon" stunt at the 2022 Xfinity 500). NASCAR cited previously existing rules that will now be enforced in a manner to ban the move.
 Loose wheel penalties have been reduced to a two-lap penalty and two-race suspension to crew members (instead of four-race crew chief suspension).
 The requirement that drivers must be in the top 30 of the standings to be eligible for the playoffs has been removed.
 Stage break cautions have been eliminated at all road course races. Stage points will still be awarded to drivers on predetermined laps, but no caution will be displayed. This was done in an effort to reduce the time spent under cautions at lengthy tracks and to increase strategy during the race.
 The choose cone rule, introduced in 2020, was extended to plate/superspeedway races for 2023, as well to dirt races. On March 9, 2023, NASCAR announced that all road courses would have the choose cone rule for 2023, meaning that every race will have this rule.

Schedule
The 2023 schedule was released on September 14, 2022. The 2023 Daytona 500 will be held on Sunday, February 19. The season finale will be at Phoenix Raceway again in 2023 during the first weekend of November. The Busch Light Clash will return to the Los Angeles Memorial Coliseum for the second year in a row and the race will be held on February 5, which again is one week before the Super Bowl and two weeks before the Daytona 500. This will be the final season for Auto Club Speedway in its current 2 mile speedway configuration, as the track drops off the schedule to reconfigure as a short track.

Bolded races indicate a NASCAR Major, also known as a Crown Jewel race.

Schedule changes

Chicago Street Course
After NASCAR used a Chicago Street Course track in the 2021 eNASCAR iRacing Pro Invitational Series, it was speculated that NASCAR would like to make it a reality and have a street race in Chicago on the Cup Series schedule in the future. On July 7, 2022, Jordan Bianchi from The Athletic reported that an official announcement of this being added to the Cup Series schedule would come on July 19. On June 17, Adam Stern from Sports Business Journal suggested that the Chicago Street Course could replace Road America on the 2023 Cup Series schedule as the street race would likely replace one of the road course races and Road America does not have a contract to have a Cup Series race in 2023. Both the addition of the Chicago street race to the schedule and the fact that it would replace the race at Road America came on July 19.

NASCAR All-Star Race
On June 24, 2022, Adam Stern also reported that Fox Sports, which has the TV rights to the All-Star Race, has been trying to convince NASCAR and Speedway Motorsports to move the NASCAR All-Star Race to a different venue each year as is the case in other sports. After the 2022 All-Star Race at Texas Motor Speedway, which was widely considered unpopular and controversial by fans and the industry, the track tweeted that they would be hosting the All-Star Race again in 2023. However, the tweet was deleted amidst negative reactions to the announcement, leading to speculation that plans could change. On September 7, it was revealed that the All-Star race will take place on the renovated North Wilkesboro Speedway. It would be the first NASCAR Cup race on the track since 1996, after its dates were replaced by races at Texas Motor Speedway and New Hampshire Motor Speedway in 1997.

Autotrader EchoPark Automotive 400
On January 2, 2023, thespun.com reported that the Autotrader EchoPark Automotive 500 at Texas Motor Speedway will be reduced to 400 miles. The article states that it is an attempted overall effort by NASCAR to hopefully reduce race times, so that they are closer to 2.5 hours, than the normal 3.5 to 4 hours.

Season summary

Race reports
Exhibition: Busch Light Clash at The Coliseum

Aric Almirola won the pole from the heat races. Ryan Blaney spun and collected Chase Elliott, Ty Gibbs, and Daniel Suarez. Blaney would spin two more times while Bubba Wallace, who led a lot of laps, spun and got into the wall. Martin Truex Jr. would hold off Austin Dillon and Kyle Busch for the win.

Speedweeks 2023

In Daytona 500 qualifying, Alex Bowman of Hendrick Motorsports won the pole and was joined on the front row by teammate Kyle Larson. Jimmie Johnson and Travis Pastrana made the Daytona 500 on speed.

In the first Duel, Bowman started on pole. Joey Logano dominated and won the caution free Duel by holding off Christopher Bell. In the second Duel, Larson started on pole. Kyle Busch spun while leading after contact with Daniel Suarez and collected Riley Herbst, Austin Hill, and Justin Haley. Aric Almirola held off Austin Cindric to win the second Duel. Conor Daly and Zane Smith made the race while Hill and Chandler Smith failed to qualify.

Round 1: Daytona 500

Alex Bowman started on pole. Brad Keselowski won the first stage. Tyler Reddick spun after contact with Kevin Harvick and collected Chase Elliott and Erik Jones. Ross Chastain won the second stage. Ryan Preece spun into the pack and collected Harvick, Michael McDowell, and Martin Truex Jr. Daniel Suarez spun, sending the race to overtime. Austin Dillon spun after contact with William Byron and collected Chastain, Jimmie Johnson, Zane Smith, and Harrison Burton. On the restart, Kyle Larson spun and collected Keselowski, Ryan Blaney, Bubba Wallace, and Travis Pastrana as Ricky Stenhouse Jr. won the race over Joey Logano under caution.

Round 2: Pala Casino 400

Christopher Bell was awarded the pole after qualifying was canceled due to rain. Kyle Larson went to the garage with an electrical issue and returned several laps down. A. J. Allmendinger spun after contact with Corey LaJoie. Ross Chastain dominated, winning both stages and leading the most laps. A wreck occurred when the field stacked up on a restart, collecting Bell, Aric Almirola, Tyler Reddick, Justin Haley, Ryan Preece, Todd Gilliland, and Ryan Blaney. Kyle Busch overtook Chastain on the final round of green flag pit stops and pulled away to score his first win with Richard Childress Racing and breaking the tie with Richard Petty for the most consecutive seasons with at least one win with 19 straight seasons.

Round 3: Pennzoil 400

Joey Logano won the pole. William Byron dominated, winning both stages and leading the most laps. Logano got into the wall after contact with Brad Keselowski and spun through the grass. Kyle Larson was headed to the win when Aric Almirola got into the wall, sending the race to overtime. A. J. Allmendinger got into the wall after contact with Ryan Preece as Byron took the lead from Martin Truex Jr. and held off teammates Larson and Alex Bowman for the win.

Round 4: United Rentals Work United 500

Kyle Larson won the pole. William Byron won the first stage while Larson won the second stage. Aric Almirola had a tire come off after a pit stop. Kevin Harvick, who was looking for his 10th career win at Phoenix Raceway, was leading comfortably with 10 laps to go, but a caution came out for a Harrison Burton spin on the frontstretch. On the caution pit stops, Harvick took 4 tires and fell back to 7th. On the ensuing restart, A. J. Allmendinger and Noah Gragson got together and collected Ty Gibbs, sending the race to overtime. Byron took the lead from Larson and held off Ryan Blaney for his second straight win. The Wednesday following the race, NASCAR handed L2 penalties to all 4 Hendrick Motorsports teams as well as the No. 31 Kaulig Racing team of Justin Haley for a loss of 100 points (owners only for No. 9, as Elliott was injured and Josh Berry, his replacement, is a Xfinity Series regular), 10 playoff points, and fined $100,000 for illegally modifying hood louvers prior to practice, while Denny Hamlin was fined $50,000 and docked 25 points for intentionally wrecking Ross Chastain on the final restart (Hamlin's penalty came after an admission on his Actions Detrimental podcast). 

Round 5: Ambetter Health 400

Joey Logano won the pole. Bubba Wallace got into the wall early as Logano won the first stage while Austin Cindric won the second stage. Kevin Harvick spun while leading and collected Josh Berry, Chris Buescher, Harrison Burton, William Byron, and BJ McLeod. Aric Almirola blew a tire while leading and spun, collecting Kyle Larson. Logano made a last lap pass on Brad Keselowski to win.

Results and standings

Race results

Drivers' championship

(key) Bold – Pole position awarded by time. Italics – Pole position set by final practice results or owner's points. * – Most laps led. 1 – Stage 1 winner. 2 – Stage 2 winner. 3 – Stage 3 winner.

Notes

Manufacturers' championship
After 5 of 36 races

See also
 2023 NASCAR Xfinity Series
 2023 NASCAR Craftsman Truck Series
 2023 ARCA Menards Series
 2023 ARCA Menards Series East
 2023 ARCA Menards Series West
 2023 NASCAR Pinty's Series
 2023 NASCAR Whelen Euro Series
 2023 SRX Series

References

NASCAR Cup Series seasons
NASCAR
NASCAR Cup
NASCAR